"In the Sun" is the second single from Joseph Arthur's second studio album Come to Where I'm From, though the song had been performed during his live shows as early as 1996.

Release
The single was released in the UK and Europe on April 23, 2001 via Real World Records and Virgin Records. The original singles were very limited in production and are now out of print and hard to find.

A music video was produced for the song, directed by Anton Corbijn. The video is featured on the Directors Label series DVD The Work of Director Anton Corbijn.

On February 14, 2008, Joseph Arthur and his band The Lonely Astronauts performed "In the Sun" live on the Late Show with David Letterman.

Track listing
CD:
"In the Sun" (Edit) – 4:08
"The Other Side" – 3:15
"Cocaine Blind" – 3:19

7" vinyl (US white label promo):
"In the Sun" (Edit) – 4:08
"Speed of Light" – 4:30

US promo CD:
"In the Sun" (Edit) – 4:08
"In the Sun" (Album Version) – 5:37
"In the Sun" (Call-Out Hook #1) – 0:10
"In the Sun" (Call-Out Hook #2) – 0:10
Tracks 5–23: Interview with Joseph Arthur, March 6, 2000 (interviewed by Bart Lipton in Los Angeles)

Use in films
The song appears in the TV series' Scrubs (episode "My New God") and Grey's Anatomy (episode "It's the End of the World)", in the 2004 comedy film Saved! and in the alternate ending to the 2002 action film The Bourne Identity.

Cover versions

Michael Stipe

In 2005, Michael Stipe of R.E.M. recorded a cover of the song with producer James Iha for a Hurricane Katrina relief benefit EP released exclusively through the iTunes Store. Stipe recorded "In the Sun" with Chris Martin of Coldplay and Joseph Arthur himself. Additionally, a remix was provided by Justin Timberlake and will.i.am. This cover of the song was originally featured in the Grey's Anatomy season 2 episode "It's the End of the World".

EP track listing
"In the Sun" (with Chris Martin) – 4:56
"In the Sun" (JAW Breakers Remix by Justin Timberlake and will.i.am) – 5:13
"In the Sun" (with Joseph Arthur) – 4:58
"In the Sun" – 4:55
"In the Sun" (Live on Austin City Limits with Coldplay) – 3:40
"In the Sun" (Live Acoustic Couch Rehearsal with Joseph Arthur) – 5:53

Other cover versions
Peter Gabriel, on the tribute album Diana, Princess of Wales: Tribute (1997). Since Joseph was on Peter Gabriel's Real World label at the time, Joseph allowed the song to be covered by Gabriel even though Joseph himself had yet to record the song for Come to Where I'm From.  The song also appears on Gabriel's album of rarities Flotsam and Jetsam.
Donna De Lory, on her album In the Glow, released by Secret Road Records.
Howie Day, uncredited, over the ending credits of the film Saved!.
Aron Wright, featured in season 11 of Grey's Anatomy during the episode "She's Leaving Home".

References

External links
  of Letterman performance

1997 songs
2001 singles
Charity singles
Donna De Lory songs
Joseph Arthur songs
Michael Stipe songs
Song recordings produced by Michael Stipe
Song recordings produced by Tchad Blake
Songs written by Joseph Arthur
Virgin Records singles
Songs about Hurricane Katrina